Karla Sofía Gascón (born Carlos Gascón, 31 March 1972) is a Spanish actress. She appeared in a number of telenovelas and films including El Señor de los Cielos and The Noble Family.

Selected filmography

References

External links
 

1972 births
Living people
Spanish film actresses
Spanish telenovela actresses
Transgender actresses
Spanish transgender people
Spanish LGBT actors